5176 Yoichi, provisional designation , is a background asteroid from the central regions of the asteroid belt, approximately  in diameter. It was discovered on 4 January 1989, by Japanese astronomers Seiji Ueda and Hiroshi Kaneda at the Kushiro Observatory on Hokkaido, Japan. The likely elongated asteroid has a brightness variation of 0.45 magnitude, and occulted a star in the constellation Cetus in November 2014. It was named for the Japanese town of Yoichi.

Orbit and classification 

Yoichi is a non-family asteroid from the main belt's background population. It orbits the Sun in the central main-belt at a distance of 1.9–3.5 AU once every 4 years and 5 months (1,609 days; semi-major axis of 2.69 AU). Its orbit has an eccentricity of 0.31 and an inclination of 8° with respect to the ecliptic.

Physical characteristics 

Yoichi is an assumed S-type asteroid, while the body's albedo is rather indicative of a carbonaceous C-type asteroid (see below).

Rotation period 

In November 2015, photometric data of Yoichi was taken by astronomers at the Oakley Southern Sky Observatory in Australia. However no rotational lightcurve could be constructed. The asteroid's brightness amplitude was 0.42 magnitude, indicative for an elongated shape. As of 2018, the body's rotation period, pole and shape remain unknown.

Diameter and albedo 

According to the surveys carried out by the Infrared Astronomical Satellite IRAS, the Japanese Akari satellite and the NEOWISE mission of NASA's Wide-field Infrared Survey Explorer, Yoichi measures between 15.68 and 19.49 kilometers in diameter and its surface has an albedo between 0.05 and 0.0849.

The Collaborative Asteroid Lightcurve Link derives an albedo of 0.0777 and a diameter of 16.54 kilometers based on an absolute magnitude of 12.3.

Occultation 

On 2 November 2014, Yoichi occulted 8.4 magnitude star  in the constellation Cetus, causing a magnitude drop from 8.4 to 14.1 during 2.8 seconds. The occultation was visible over Southern Japan, Eastern China, as well as from Southern California to North Florida. An approximate diameter of 20 kilometers was assumed for the asteroid.

Naming 

This minor planet was named after the Japanese town of Yoichi on Hokkaido, where the discovering Kushiro Observatory is located. The official naming citation was published by the Minor Planet Center on 4 August 2001.

References

External links 
 Asteroid Lightcurve Database (LCDB), query form (info )
 Dictionary of Minor Planet Names, Google books
 Asteroids and comets rotation curves, CdR – Observatoire de Genève, Raoul Behrend
 Discovery Circumstances: Numbered Minor Planets (5001)-(10000) – Minor Planet Center
 
 

005176
Discoveries by Seiji Ueda
Discoveries by Hiroshi Kaneda
Named minor planets
19890104